Mackay railway station is located on the North Coast line in Queensland, Australia. It serves the city of Mackay. The station has one side and one south facing bay platform. Opposite the station are a number of sidings that form part of a trans shipment yard north of the station.

History
The original Mackay station opened in 1885 in Tennyson Street. In 1924, it was relocated to Boddington Street. In the 1990s, the rail bridge over the Pioneer River needed to be replaced, which presented an opportunity for re-alignment of the railway line to bypass the Mackay CBD. In 1994, the new alignment opened with the new Mackay railway station in the outer suburb of Paget.

Services
Mackay is served by Traveltrain's Spirit of Queensland service.

References

External links

Mackay station Queensland's Railways on the Internet

Central Queensland
Railway stations in Australia opened in 1994
Regional railway stations in Queensland
North Coast railway line, Queensland